

Ud 
Udurlije

Ug 
Ugošće

Uh 
Uhotići

Us 
Uskoplje (municipality Ravno), Ustikolina,  Ustiprača

Uš 
Ušanovići

Ut 
Utješinovići

Uz 
Uzarići (Široki Brijeg)

Lists of settlements in the Federation of Bosnia and Herzegovina (A-Ž)